Rajendra Prasad Roy (born 26 January 1962) is an Indian chemical biologist, biochemist and a scientist at the National Institute of Immunology. Known for his studies in protein engineering, Roy has developed several chemo-enzymatic strategic processes for which he has a patent assigned to him. He holds a PhD from the Indian Institute of Science and is an elected fellow of all the three major Indian science academies namely Indian National Science Academy, Indian Academy of Sciences, and National Academy of Sciences, India. The Department of Biotechnology of the Government of India awarded him the National Bioscience Award for Career Development, one of the highest Indian science awards, for him contributions to biosciences in 2005.
Currently he is the dean of Regional Centre for Biotechnology, Faridabad.

Patents

See also 
 Bioconjugate Chemistry

Notes

References

External links 
 

N-BIOS Prize recipients
Indian scientific authors
Living people
Fellows of The National Academy of Sciences, India
Fellows of the Indian Academy of Sciences
Fellows of the Indian National Science Academy
1962 births
Scientists from Delhi
Indian biochemists
Indian patent holders
21st-century Indian inventors